Richard "Dick" Wheeler (January 14, 1898 in Keene, New Hampshire – February 12, 1962 in Lexington, Massachusetts) was a right-handed Major League Baseball outfielder who played for the St. Louis Cardinals in 1918. He was born Richard Wheeler Maynard.

Prior to playing professionally, he attended Amherst College. At 20 years of age - the seventh youngest player in the league - Wheeler made his major league debut on June 13, 1918. He appeared in three games for the Cardinals that season, collecting no hits in six at-bats for a .000 batting average. On July 17, 1918, he appeared in his final game.

Following his death, he was interred at Westview Cemetery in Lexington, Massachusetts.

References

1898 births
1962 deaths
Baseball players from New Hampshire
St. Louis Cardinals players
Major League Baseball outfielders
Amherst Mammoths baseball players